The Chattanooga Mocs women's basketball team, formerly known as the Lady Mocs, represents the University of Tennessee at Chattanooga in Chattanooga, Tennessee, in NCAA women's basketball competition. The team is currently led by head coach Shawn Poppie, and play their home games at McKenzie Arena.

The team has won 19 SoCon Tournament championships, five consecutively from 2013 through 2017, and have made 16 NCAA tournament appearances, most recently in 2023. The 2015–16 team began the season ranked 25th in the AP poll.

2018–19 roster

Head Coaches
The Chattanooga women's team has had only six coaches in their 42-season history: Grace Keith, Sharon Fanning-Otto, Craig Parrott, Wes Moore, Jim Foster, and Katie Burrows.

Grace Keith
Keith had settled into teaching for two years at Chattanooga's Hixson Elementary School, following her 12 years of coaching the girls' basketball team at Hixson High School. Title IX became law in 1972 and began affecting the mostly male-dominated college athletics across the US, allowing women to participate. Harold Wilkes, then athletic director for UTC and friend to Keith's superiors, offered her a job as head coach for the UTC Mocettes. After a few chaotic months of building a program, the former intramural Chattanooga team began its varsity era in the Association for Intercollegiate Athletics for Women, eight years before the NCAA allowed women's basketball as a sport. In 1976, Keith retired from basketball to return to teaching.

Sharon Fanning-Otto
One of the players Keith recruited was Chattanooga High School standout Sharon Fanning, who also played and later coached both UTC's volleyball (until 1978) and women's basketball teams. Fanning also renamed the Mocettes as the Lady Mocs. In 1982, the NCAA began hosting women's championships. The Lady Mocs joined the Southern Conference, which only included East Tennessee State, Marshall and Appalachian State University. UTC claimed the first regular season title that year and went on to win five straight titles under Fanning's leadership. She went on to become an eight-year head coach for the Kentucky Wildcats in 1987 and retired in 2012, following a 17-year coaching career with the Mississippi State Lady Bulldogs.

Craig Parrott
Craig Parrott had spent several years coaching high school basketball teams before Fanning offered him an assistant coaching job at UTC in 1986. The following year, Fanning departed for Kentucky and Parrott was asked to fill the position. He became the first coach to take the program to the NCAA Tournament, after winning   the SoCon Tournament in 1989. In the 1991–92 season, he again led the team to the NCAA, after sharing the regular season conference title and winning the SoCon. In 1998, he returned to coaching high school teams in Walker County, Georgia, and retired in 2014.

Wes Moore
Wes Moore became the fourth Chattanooga women's basketball coach in 1998. In 15 seasons, he led the Lady Mocs to 12 SoCon regular season titles, nine SoCon tournament championships, and nine NCAA Tournament berths, becoming the winningest coach in UTC and SoCon history. The six-time SoCon Coach of the Year had an overall record of 358–113, 222–42 (SoCon). In 2013, he went on to coach the NC State Wolfpack.

Jim Foster
On May 9, 2013, Chattanooga announced the hiring of Jim Foster to become the new head women's basketball coach. Foster has 37 years of coaching experience at St. Joseph's, Vanderbilt, Ohio State University and Chattanooga, along with four Big Ten Conference coach of the year awards. Soon after taking the job at Chattanooga, Foster was voted into the Women's Basketball Hall of Fame. Foster retired from coaching at the end of the 2018 season.

Katie Burrows
In May 2018, Katie Burrows was named as the new head women's basketball coach. An alumna of Chattanooga, Burrows served as an assistant coach under Moore and Foster, respectively.

Shawn Poppie
In 30 March 2022, Shawn Poppie was named as the new head women's basketball coach. Previously he was assistant coach under Kenny Brooks at the Virginia Tech since 2016.

NCAA tournament results
The Mocs have appeared in fifteen NCAA Tournaments, with a combined record of 1–15.

See also
Chattanooga Mocs

References

External links
 

 
Basketball teams established in 1974
1974 establishments in Tennessee